Rentarō, Rentaro or Rentarou (written: 連太郎 or 廉太郎) is a masculine Japanese given name. Notable people with the name include:

, Japanese actor
, Japanese statesman and politician
, Japanese classical pianist and composer
, Japanese ryūkōka singer

Fictional Characters
 Rentarō Satomi from the light novel series Black Bullet
 Rentarō Aijō from the manga Kimi no koto ga Dai Dai Dai Dai Daisuki na 100-nin no Kanojo
 Rentaro Kagura From Kamen Rider Shinobi Kamen Rider Zi-O

See also
8877 Rentaro, main-belt asteroid

Japanese masculine given names